The Laughing Woman (Latin: Femina ridens), also known as The Frightened Woman, is a 1969 Italian erotic thriller film directed by Piero Schivazappa.

Plot
Dr. Sayer, the director of a philanthropic foundation, spends his weekends at his luxurious villa outside of Rome toying with sadistic fantasies. His games are usually acted out with the help of a prostitute conversant with his desires. When his regular prostitute becomes unavailable at the last minute, Sayer substitutes Maria, a young journalist on his staff. After the drugged Maria regains consciousness at his villa, Sayer realizes that he now has a real victim on his hands. She is subjected to his unpleasant games but soon begins subverting him.

Cast 
Philippe Leroy: Doctor Sayer
Dagmar Lassander: Mary
Lorenza Guerrieri: Gida
Varo Soleri: Administrator
Maria Cumani Quasimodo: Sayer's Secretary
Mirella Pamphili: Streetwalker

Soundtrack 

The soundtrack to the film was composed by Stelvio Cipriani and released in 1969.

Track listing

Side A 
Week-End With Mary
Love Symbol
Hot Skin
Chorus And Brass "Fugato"
Rendez-Vous In The Castle
Sophisticated Shake

Side B 
"Femina Ridens" Song
Mary's Theme
The Shower
The Run In The Alley
Fight Of Love

References

External links 

1960s erotic thriller films
BDSM in films
Italian erotic thriller films
Films directed by Piero Schivazappa
Films scored by Stelvio Cipriani
1960s Italian-language films
1960s Italian films